RallyPoint is a privately held American company founded in 2012 by military veterans Yinon Weiss and Aaron Kletzing at Harvard Business School. The company is a professional network serving the US military and its veterans, and has been called "LinkedIn for the military,". The community allows current military members and veterans to connect, explore career opportunities both inside and outside the military, and engage on topics important to the military.

In April 2012, RallyPoint won $10,000 for placing as runner-up in the Harvard Business School Business Plan Competition and on October 23, 2012, RallyPoint won $100,000 from MassChallenge after competing against over 1,300 other ventures. The company raised private funding after both of these events.

RallyPoint was launched out of the Harvard Innovation Lab at the Harvard Business School, and is currently headquartered in Waltham, Massachusetts.

History 

The company's two co-founders, Yinon Weiss and Aaron Kletzing, first met in Iraq in a remote combat outpost northwest of Baghdad in 2008. Several years later, the two ran into each other again as students this time at Harvard Business School.

Company

Website 

RallyPoint is a professional network available to all US military members and veterans, described by Forbes as "LinkedIn on steroids for members of the military."

Information of users and connections is sorted based on the military structure, such as rank, specialty, duty position, and duty location.

According to the Huffington Post, RallyPoint is "solving two problems by creating both an easy-to-use professional network within the military, as well as the most technologically advanced employer-to-servicemember matching network in the country."

References

External links 

 

American companies established in 2012
Professional networks
American social networking websites
Software companies based in Massachusetts
Privately held companies based in Massachusetts
Companies based in Boston
Software companies of the United States